The Goldberg Group is a sub-group of the Hohe Tauern mountain range within the Central Eastern Alps. It is located in Austria, in the states of Salzburg and Carinthia. Its highest peak is the Hocharn, .

Name 
The name of the group is related to the rich mineral ores of the area and the associated historic mining. Gold was mined in the Rauris valley as well as in the Gastein valley (in the Radhausberg Massif), and helped those two valleys – and also the Archbishops of Salzburg as feudal lords – in the High Middle Ages to gain enormous wealth.

Not until the 19th century the mines were finally closed due to unprofitability. Even today, gold can be panned in the Rauris. Peaks like the Goldbergspitze (3,073 m) and Goldzechkopf (3,042 m) recall times long past when gold was mined in the High Tauern. In addition, silver – as indicated by Silberpfennig (2,600 m) – and other precious metals were mined, as were precious stones (aquamarine, garnet and others).

Geography 
The Goldberg Group lies in the eastern half of the Hohe Tauern range. In the west of the group is the Großglockner High Alpine Road, in the east runs the Tauern Railway.

The boundaries of the Goldberg Group, based on the Alpine Club classification of the Eastern Alps, where they are shown as group no. 42, are formed as follows:
 To the north: Salzach River from Taxenbach down to its confluence with the Gasteiner Ache creek
 To the east: Gasteiner Ache (Gastein Valley) up to the Nassfeld headwaters – Gasteiner Tauern (Niederer Tauern) (Pass of the Alpine divide) – Mallnitz Creek as far as its confluence with the Möll River
 To the south: Möll Valley (running east-southeast up to Winklern)
 To the west: from the upper course of the Möll to Heiligenblut – along the Großglockner High Alpine Road to Hochtor Pass – down Seidlwinkl Valley to Rauris and Taxenbach.

According to the Mountain Range Classification for the Austrian Cave Directory (Gebirgsgruppengliederung für das österreichische Höhlenverzeichnis) according to Hubert Trimmel, in which the group is given no. 2580, the boundary is not formed by the Mallnitzer Tauern above Nassfeld, but by the Hoher Tauern Pass and the Anlauf Valley.

Neighbouring ranges 
Together with the Ankogel Group, the Glockner Group, the Schober Group, the Kreuzeck Group, the Granatspitz Group, the Venediger Group, the Villgraten Mountains and the Rieserferner Group, the Goldberg Group is among the major mountain groups of the High Tauern.

Subdivision 
According to the Mountain Range Classification for the Austrian Cave Directory, the group is further subdivided as follows:
 Sadnig Group in the knee of the River Möll
 Sonnblick–Böseck Group between the Hüttwinkl and Möll valleys
 Gamskarlspitze Group between Gastein and Mallnitz valleys
 Edelweißspitze Group between Fusch and Rauris valleys as far as the Salzach
 Hocharn Group between Hüttwinkl valley, Seidlwinkel valley and Hochtor (Grossglockner Road)
 Bernkogel–Türchlwand Group between Rauris and Gastein valleys as far as the Salzach
The Edelweißspitze Group (Radhausberg Massif) is part of the Ankogel Group according to the Alpine Club classification.

Summits 

All the named three-thousanders in the Goldberg Group:

Hocharn 
Schareck 
Grieswies-Schwarzkogel 
Hoher Sonnblick 
Baumbachspitze 
Krumlkeeskopf 
Roter Mann 
Sandkopf 
Arlthöhe 
Goldbergspitze 
Schneehorn 
Goldzechkopf 
Schlapperebenspitzen max. 
Weinflaschenkopf 
Ritterkopf 
Noespitze

Literature 
 Liselotte Buchenauer, Peter Holl: Alpine Club Guide Ankogel- und Goldberggruppe. Bergverlag Rudolf Rother, Munich, 1986. 

 Ingeborg Auer, Reinhard Böhm, Martin Leymüller, Wolfgang Schöner: Das Klima des Sonnblicks – Klimaatlas und Klimatographie der GAW-Station Sonnblick einschließlich der umgebenden Gebirgsregion, ZAMG Vienna, 2002, ISSN 1016-6254.
 
 Franz Stelzer: Grundzüge der Landformen der Goldberggruppe. In: Geographischer Jahresbericht aus Österreich 29, pp. 75–94.

References

External links

 
Mountain ranges of the Alps
Zell am See District
St. Johann im Pongau District
Mountain ranges of Carinthia (state)
Mountain ranges of Salzburg (state)